The 2013–14 SC Freiburg season was the 110th season in the club's football history. In addition to the Bundesliga at promoted to 2. Bundesliga in 2009, the club also competed in the DFB-Pokal and the Europa League.

Fixtures and results

Legend

Bundesliga

League table

League fixtures and results

Results summary

DFB-Pokal

Europa League

Group stage

Group fixtures and results

Group table

Squad information

Squad and statistics

Squad, appearances and goals

Minutes played

Bookings

Transfers

In:

Out:

Notes
1.Kickoff is in Central European Time/Central European Summer Time.
2.SC Freiburg goals first.

References

Freiburg
SC Freiburg seasons
Freiburg